Velalar Vidyalayaa  is a co-educational  senior secondary school  located at Thindal, Erode district in the state of Tamil Nadu in India.  Velalar Vidyalayaa is founded in the year 2010, and affiliated to the Central Board of Secondary Education. The School is owned and managed by Vellalar Educational Trust, Erode.

Infrastructure
The building covers an area of 2,12,000 Sq.ft with two blocks (Main & Montessori) connected by a bridge.

Facilities
The school has Orel Digital Language Lab, Physics, Chemistry & Biology Lab, Math Lab & Composite Lab and Computer Labs with 95 systems. The library houses a variety of books and many journals. Students can borrow resources for a period of two weeks and can get this period extended twice. There is a separate Hostel for boys and girls.

References

External links
 Official website

See also 
 List of Educational Institutions in Erode

High schools and secondary schools in Tamil Nadu
Schools in Erode district
Education in Erode